Storyville Records was a jazz record company and label founded by George Wein in Boston in the 1950s.  It is not related to the Danish record label of the same name.

References
birkajazz.com "Various US labels, Part 3"

American record labels
Jazz record labels